Ibn al-ʿImād (1623-1679), full name ʿAbd al-Ḥayy bin Aḥmad bin Muḥammad ibn al-ʿImād al-ʿAkarī al-Ḥanbalī Abū al-Falāḥ, was a Syrian Muslim historian and faqih of the Hanbali school.

Life
Born in the Al-Salihiyah quarter of Damascus, he lived in Cairo for a long period, where he studied under Sultan al-Mazzahi, Nur al-Din Shabramallasi, Shihab al-Din al-Qalyubi, and others, before returning to Damascus to teach. His students included Muhammad ibn Fadlallah al-Muhibbi and Mustafa al-Hamawi. Ibn al-ʿImad died while undertaking the Hajj and was buried in Mecca. He was primarily known for his lengthy biographical dictionary Shadharāt al-dhahab fī akhbār man dhahab ("Fragments of Gold in the Accounts of Those Who Have Departed"), completed in 1670, and covers the first ten centuries of Islamic history. It focuses on providing detailed obituary notices and is an important source in Islamic studies.

Works 
Shadharāt al-dhahab fī akhbār man dhahab; (Al-Qāhira, Maktaba al-Qudsī, 1931-1932)
Sharḥ matn al-muntahá fī fiqh al-Ḥanābilah
Sharḥ badīʿiyyat Ibn Ḥijjah

References

External links 
Ibn al-ʿImād's works (in Arabic)

1623 births
1679 deaths
17th-century Arabs
17th-century biographers
17th-century Muslim scholars of Islam
17th-century Syrian historians
Arab Sunni Muslim scholars of Islam
Hadith scholars
Hanbalis
Encyclopedists from the Ottoman Empire
Writers from Damascus
Sunni Muslim scholars of Islam
Syrian scholars